United Nations Security Council Resolution 381, adopted on November 30, 1975, considered a report by the Secretary-General regarding the United Nations Disengagement Observer Force and noted the discussions the Secretary-General had with all the concerned parties to the Middle East situation.  The council expressed its concern over the continuing tension in the area and decided to:

(a) To reconvene on 12 January 1976, to continue the debate on the Middle East problem including the Palestinian question, taking into account all relevant United Nations resolutions;
(b) To renew the mandate of the United Nations Disengagement Observer Force for another period of six months;
(c) To request the Secretary-General to keep the Security Council informed on further developments.

The resolution was adopted by 13 votes to none; China and Iraq did not participate in the vote.

See also
 Arab–Israeli conflict
 Israel–Syria relations
 List of United Nations Security Council Resolutions 301 to 400 (1971–1976)
 Yom Kippur War

References
Text of the Resolution at undocs.org

External links
 

 0381
 0381
November 1975 events